An election was held on November 6, 2012 to elect all 100 members to Montana's House of Representatives. The election coincided with elections for other offices, including U.S. President, U.S. Senate, U.S. House of Representatives, Governor and State Senate. The primary election was held on June 5, 2012.

Republicans retained control of the House despite a net loss of seven seats, winning 61 seats compared to 39 seats for the Democrats.

Results

Statewide
Statewide results of the 2012 Montana House of Representatives election:

District
Results of the 2012 Montana House of Representatives election by district:

References

House of Representatives
Montana House of Representatives
2012